A carbuncle or escarbuncle  is a heraldic charge consisting of eight radiating rods or spokes, four of which make a common cross and the other four a saltire. The ends typically terminate in a fleur-de-lis or some other decorative form. Frequently the centrepoint is adorned with a jewel; the name may therefore be a reference to a carbuncle gemstone though in heraldry the jewel need not be red. 

It has its origins in the iron bands and bosses historically used to strengthen shields. The name may therefore be derived from the Old French boucle, meaning a shield boss.

Gallery

References 

Heraldic charges

fr:Liste des meubles héraldiques#Escarboucle